Frank the Baptist is an American alternative rock band founded in San Diego, California by frontman Frank Vollmann.

History 
Strobelight Records was founded to release their first album, Different Degrees of Empty, in 2003, and all of the band's following albums have been released by the record label. In 2004, the band toured Europe for the first time to support their second album, Beggars Would Ride. The band played at the Wave-Gotik-Treffen music festival in May 2005.

Frank Vollmann relocated to Berlin in 2006, joining long-time comrades Fez Wrecker (Bonniwell Music Machine, The Fuzztones) and Benn Ra (Hatesex, ex-Diva Destruction), both of whom had coincidentally played in early incarnations of Frank the Baptist in San Diego in 1997–1998. East Berliner Phantomas joined on drums, and the new line-up debuted at The Villa in Leipzig on Friday 13, 2006.

In November 2006, the band went into Studio Wong in Berlin-Kreuzberg and recorded the band's latest album, The New Colossus.

The band maintains a headquarters of sorts at a bar run by Frank and Fez, called "The Speakeasy Berlin".

Current members 
Frank Vollmann – vocals and guitars
Emilio Cordero Checa – bass
Gerrit Hassler – guitars
Salo Bosse – drums

Past members
Julio Cardador - bass
Fez Wrecker – guitar
Ben Bowen – bass
Thomas Fietz – drums
Ralf Huenefeld – guitar
Justin Stephens – bass
Mario Usai (Clan of Xymox) – bass
Carsten Klatte (Project Pitchfork, Peter Hepner)
Ilija Gavrilenko – bass
Scot "The Hoople" Evans – guitar
Barry "The Dead" Perzan – bass
Eric "E-train" Schlosser – bass
"Camp" Dave Hamersma – drums
Thomas Fuhr – guitar
Rob Podzunas – bass
Wood – bass
Anthony De La Cruz – keyboards

Discography 
Different Degrees of Empty (2003)
Beggars Would Ride (2004)
The New Colossus (2007)
As the Camp Burns (2015)
Road Omen (2019)

External links 
 Official website

American death rock groups